The black-necked eremomela (Eremomela atricollis) is a species of bird formerly placed in the "Old World warbler" assemblage, but now placed in the family Cisticolidae.

It is found in Angola, Democratic Republic of the Congo, and Zambia.
Its natural habitats are subtropical or tropical dry forests and dry savanna (namely miombo woodland).

References

black-necked eremomela
Birds of Southern Africa
black-necked eremomela
Taxonomy articles created by Polbot